Haratch ('Forward') was an Armenian language weekly newspaper published from Beirut, Lebanon 1957-1970. Founded in January 1957, it was an organ of the Lebanese Communist Party. It stopped publication in 1970.

In 1971 the Communist Party began publishing a new Armenian language weekly, Gantch.

References

1957 establishments in Lebanon
1970 disestablishments in Lebanon
Armenian-language newspapers published in Lebanon
Communist newspapers
Defunct newspapers published in Lebanon
Defunct weekly newspapers
Newspapers published in Beirut
Publications established in 1957
Publications disestablished in 1970
Weekly newspapers published in Lebanon